Scrobipalpula semirosea is a moth in the family Gelechiidae. It is found solely in North America, where it has been observed in Texas.

References

Scrobipalpula
Moths described in 1929